Jarrod O'Connor (born 20 July 2001) is a professional rugby league footballer who plays as a , or  for the Leeds Rhinos in the Super League.

He has spent time on loan from Leeds at the Bradford Bulls and Featherstone Rovers in the Betfred Championship.

Background
O'Connor played his amateur rugby league with the Halton Farnworth Hornets. Jarrod is the son of former Salford, Widnes, Wigan, and Great Britain , Terry O'Connor, who now works for Sky Sports.

Career

Leeds Rhinos
O'Connor made his Super League debut in round 14 of the 2020 Super League season for Leeds against the Catalans Dragons, he converted a Rhys Evans try in the 29th minute.
On 24 September 2022, O'Connor played for Leeds in their 24-12 loss to St Helens RFC in the 2022 Super League Grand Final.

Bradford Bulls (loan)
On 2 December 2021, it was reported that he had signed for Bradford in the RFL Championship on loan.

References

External links
Leeds Rhinos profile
SL profile

2001 births
Living people
Bradford Bulls players
English people of Irish descent
English rugby league players
Featherstone Rovers players
Leeds Rhinos players
Rugby league second-rows
Rugby league players from Widnes